LSZ may refer to:

 Lysergic acid 2,4-dimethylazetidide, an analogue of LSD
 LSZ reduction formula, a method to calculate the scattering amplitudes from the time-ordered correlation functions of a quantum field theory
Lošinj Airport, Croatia